Howard Cornelius Wall (December 1854 – March 15, 1909) was an American Major League Baseball shortstop who played in one game for the 1873 Washington Blue Legs of the National Association. At 18, Wall was the fourth-youngest player in the National Association.  He played his lone game on September 13, and collected one hit in three at bats for a .333 batting average.  Wall died at the age of 54 in his hometown of Washington, D.C., and is interred at Oak Hill Cemetery.

References

External links

1854 births
1909 deaths
Washington Blue Legs players
Major League Baseball shortstops
Baseball players from Washington, D.C.
19th-century baseball players
Burials at Oak Hill Cemetery (Washington, D.C.)